Kal Ho Naa Ho is a 2003 Indian Hindi-language romantic comedy-drama film directed by Nikkhil Advani. The film stars Jaya Bachchan, Shah Rukh Khan, Saif Ali Khan and Preity Zinta. Sushma Seth, Reema Lagoo, Lillete Dubey and Delnaaz Irani play supporting roles. The film's story focuses on Naina Catherine Kapur (Preity Zinta), a MBA student who falls in love with Aman Mathur (Shah Rukh Khan). He does not reciprocate her feelings as he is a terminally ill heart patient, a fact he hides from Naina. Aman does not wish to bring Naina any pain through his illness, and tries to make her fall in love with her friend and fellow MBA classmate Rohit Patel (Saif Ali Khan). The film's dialogues were written by Niranjan Iyengar while Karan Johar drafted the story and screenplay. The latter also co-produced the film with his father, Yash Johar, under the Dharma Productions banner. The soundtrack for Kal Ho Naa Ho was composed by Shankar–Ehsaan–Loy while Javed Akhtar wrote the lyrics for its songs. Anil Mehta and Sanjay Sankla handled the cinematography and editing respectively. Sharmishta Roy was in charge of the production design.

Produced on a budget of ₹280 million, Kal Ho Naa Ho was released on 27 November 2003 and received positive reviews from critics. It was a commercial success, grossing ₹860.9 million worldwide. The film won 35 awards from 78 nominations; its direction, story, screenplay, performances of the cast members, music and cinematography have received the most attention from award groups.

At the 51st National Film Awards, Shankar–Ehsaan–Loy and Sonu Nigam won for Best Music Direction and Best Male Playback Singer respectively. Kal Ho Naa Ho led the 49th Filmfare Awards with eleven nominations including Best Film (Karan Johar, Yash Johar), Best Director (Nikkhil Advani) and Best Actor (Shah Rukh Khan). It went on to win in eight categories, including Best Actress (Zinta), Best Supporting Actor (Saif Ali Khan) and Best Supporting Actress (Bachchan). The film won thirteen awards out of seventeen nominations at the 5th IIFA Awards, including Best Film (Karan Johar, Yash Johar), Best Actress (Zinta), Best Supporting Actor (Saif Ali Khan) and Best Supporting Actress (Bachchan). It garnered eighteen nominations at the inaugural ceremony of the Producers Guild Film Awards and won six, Best Actress in a Supporting Role (Bachchan), Best Music Director (Shankar–Ehsaan–Loy), Best Lyricist (Akhtar), Best Male Playback Singer (Sonu Nigam), Best Debut Director (Advani) and Best Cinematography (Mehta). Among other wins, Kal Ho Naa Ho received three Screen Awards, two Zee Cine Awards and a Stardust Award.

Awards and nominations

See also 
 List of Bollywood films of 2003

Notes

References

External links 
 Accolades for Kal Ho Naa Ho at the Internet Movie Database

Kal Ho Naa Ho